The Bristol Channel Fault Zone or Central Bristol Channel Fault Zone is a major south-dipping geological fault, or zone of faulting, running approximately west–east in the Bristol Channel between England and Wales. It makes landfall just south of Weston-super-Mare and the Mendip Hills. It forms a divide between the late Palaeozoic age South Wales basin to the north and the Culm Basin to the south. It marks a major change in the pre-Variscan geology of the United Kingdom, juxtaposing very different sequences of Devonian and Lower Carboniferous rocks. During the Variscan, the fault may have acted as either a strike-slip fault or a thrust fault or indeed both; its nature remains uncertain. During the Triassic to Jurassic, the fault zone was active as an extensional fault, controlling the development of the Bristol Channel Basin.

See also
List of geological faults of England
List of geological faults of Wales

References

Geology of the United Kingdom
Geology of Somerset